Mortadha Ben Ouanes (born 2 July 1994) is a Tunisian professional footballer who plays as a left-back for Süper Lig club Kasımpaşa and the Tunisia national team.

Club career
Ben Ouanes is trained at the Etoile Sportive du Sahel (ESS), where he goes through all categories of young people. He started in the first division during the 2013–14 season.

In January 2015, he was loaned for six months to the Monastiran Sports Union. His loan with this team turned out to be a failure, since he only played one match in the league.

In July 2015, he transferred to the Bizertin Athletic Club (CAB) With this team, he scored four league goals during the 2015–16 season.

In January 2018, he found his training club.

During the 2019–20 season, he scored four league goals with ESS.

He participates with the same club in the CAF Champions League, the CAF Confederation Cup and the CAF Supercup. He is thus quarter-finalist of the Champions League in 2020.

International career
Ben Ouanes played his first match for the Tunisia national team on 21 September 2019, in a friendly against Libya. This match won 1–0 is part of the qualifiers for the 2020 African Nations Championship.

Honours
ES Sahel
 Tunisian Ligue Professionnelle 1: 2018–19
 Tunisian Cup: 2018–19
 Arab Club Champions Cup: 2018–19

References

External links

1994 births
Living people
People from Sousse
Tunisian footballers
Association football fullbacks
Tunisian Ligue Professionnelle 1 players
Süper Lig players
Étoile Sportive du Sahel players
CA Bizertin players
US Monastir (football) players
Kasımpaşa S.K. footballers
Tunisia international footballers
Tunisian expatriate footballers
Tunisian expatriate sportspeople in Turkey
Expatriate footballers in Turkey